

The LAK-9 Lietuva was an open-class competition sailplane produced in the Soviet Union in the 1970s. It was based on the LAK BK-7 that had been produced in small numbers since 1972. Like it, the LAK-9 was a conventional sailplane design with a high-set cantilever wing and a conventional empennage. The landing gear consisted of a retractable monowheel and a tailwheel, and construction throughout was of fibreglass.

The type came to the attention of the West when a LAK-9 was flown in the 1976 Gliding World Championships in Finland, the first entry by the Soviet Union since 1968. Piloted by O. Pasetnik, it was withdrawn from competition due to aileron damage.

The fourth batch to be produced was designated the LAK-9M (for "Modernised"), and a motorglider version was also produced.

Specifications (LAK-9)

See also

References

External links

About LAK-9 in www.lizdas.lt (lithuanian lang.

1970s Soviet sailplanes
Glider aircraft
LAK aircraft
High-wing aircraft
Motor gliders
Aircraft first flown in 1976